Wolfgang Heidrich is a German-Canadian computer scientist and Professor at the King Abdullah University of Science and Technology (KAUST), for which he served as the director of Visual Computing Center. from 2014 to 2021. He was previously a professor at the University of British Columbia (UBC), where he was a Dolby Research Chair  (2008-2013). His research has combined methods from computer graphics, optics, machine vision, imaging, inverse methods, and perception to develop new Computational Imaging and Display technologies. His more recent interest focuses on hardware-software co-design of the next generation of imaging systems, with applications such as high dynamic range (HDR) imaging, compact computational cameras, hyper-spectral cameras, wavefront sensors, to name just a few.

Heidrich is best known for his work in developing the high dynamic range (HDR) imaging and displays, which served as the basis for the technology behind Brightside Technologies, which was acquired by Dolby in 2007, and then later on (as part of the Dolby vision) turned into one of the core technical solutions for commercial displays.

In 2010, Heidrich, along with Erik Reinhard, Paul Debevec, Sumanta Pattanaik, Greg Ward, and Karol Myszkowsk, published the book High Dynamic Range Imaging: Acquisition, Display, and Image-Based Lighting, that later on became an essential resource for people working with images

Heidrich was presented AAIA  Fellow, IEEE Fellow, and Eurograpihcs  Fellow in 2022, 2021, and 2013, respectively. He was the recipient of a Humboldt Research Award (2014), a Charles A. McDowell Award for Excellence in Research  (2011), a NSERC Discovery Accelerator Supplement  (2010), and a Peter Wall Institute for Advanced Studies Early Career Scholar Award (2002).

Biography 
Heidrich received his Diplom informatiker from University of Erlangen (1995), an M.Math in computer science from University of Waterloo (1996), and a PhD (with honours) in computer science from University of Erlangen (1999). Before joining UBC, he was a Research Associate at Max-Planck-Institute for Computer Science (1999-2000). Then, he became a faculty member at the University of British Columbia (UBC) computer science (2000-2018). Since 2014, he has been affiliated with King Abdullah University of Science and Technology (KAUST) CS and ECE.

References 

Year of birth missing (living people)
Living people